Jean-Marc Parisis (born 1962) is a French writer and journalist. He is the author of seven novels, five stories and a biography, as well as various prefaces and anthologies.

Biography 
After studying letters (hypokhâgne and khâgne at lycée Lakanal at Sceaux, which inspired him Le Lycée des artistes), Jean-Marc Parisis made his debuts at Libération at age 20. Since 1983, he has written articles in numerous newspapers and magazines: Libération, Le Figaro Littéraire, Le Quotidien de Paris, Metro, Le Monde, Le Point, Le Figaro Magazine...

He directed the collection "La Désinvolture" at éditions du Quai Voltaire  from 1987 to 1989 and the collection "Colère" at Éditions du Rocher from 2000 to 2005.

Works

Novels 
 1987: La Mélancolie des fast foods, Grasset
 1992: Le Lycée des artistes, Grasset (prix littéraire de la vocation)
 2000: Depuis toute la vie, Grasset
 2005: Physique, Stock
 2007: Avant, pendant, après, Stock (prix Roger Nimier)
 2009: Les Aimants, Stock
 2012: La Recherche de la couleur, Stock

Biography 
 1995: Reiser, biography of Jean-Marc Reiser, Grasset

Narrations 
 2002: Mariage à la parisienne, narration, National Geographic.
 2003: Renvoi d'ascenseur, La Table Ronde.
 2013: La Mort de Jean-Marc Roberts, La Table Ronde 
 2014: Les Inoubliables, Flammarion.
 2016: À côté, jamais avec, JC Lattès.

Prefaces 
1995: Immédiatement, by Dominique de Roux, series "La petite vermillon", La Table Ronde
1999: La robe de laine, by Henry Bordeaux, Éditions du Rocher
2007: La Mort de L.- F. Céline, by Dominique de Roux, series "La petite vermillon", La Table Ronde
2009: Les fiancées sont froides, by Guy Dupré, series "La petite vermillon", La Table Ronde
2010: L’Écologie, by Reiser, Glénat
2011: Les Années Pilote, by Reiser, Glénat
 La Peau de chagrin, by Honoré de Balzac, Flammarion, Coll. GF, 2013. This presentation was performed as a reading at Théâtre de l'Odéon.
  Cent manières d'être ridicule, by Barbey d'Aurevilly, Flammarion, Coll. GF, 2015. Presentation of the text in the form of an imaginary dialogue with Barbey d'Aurevilly.

Anthologies 
1988: Au Marbre, by Guy Dupré, Françoise Sagan and François Nourissier, Quai Voltaire/La Désinvolture
1999: Une bibliothèque d'écrivains, Éditions du Rocher
2008: Reiser à la une, Glénat
2013: Reiser, Glénat

Literary prizes 
  Prix littéraire de la vocation in 1992, for Le Lycée des artistes.
  Prix Roger Nimier in 2007, for Avant, pendant, après.
  Finalist of Prix Renaudot in 2009 for Les aimants.
 Prix de la Page 112 in 2012 for La Recherche de la couleur
  Finalist of Prix Renaudot in 2014 for Les inoubliables.

References

External links 
  Émission Les Bonnes feuilles 21 August 2012, by Sandrine Treiner and Augustin Trapenard, France Culture
  Le Figaro, article sur Les aimants 
  Site Evene
 Interview of Jean-Marc Parisis in the program "Physique" by Olivier Barrot
 Article on "Les aimants" by Yann Moix in le Figaro littéraire
 Hommage to Jean-Marc Roberts, Foire du Livre of Brive-la-Gaillarde, 2013 
 Reading of La Peau de chagrin, by Balzac at Théâtre de l'Odéon

20th-century French journalists
21st-century French journalists
20th-century French novelists
21st-century French novelists
Roger Nimier Prize winners
1962 births
Living people